Mudar is an Arabic origin word which is used as a masculine given name and a surname. People with the name include:

Given name
 Mudar Badran (born 1934), Jordanian politician
 Mudar ibn Nizar, ancestor of the Mudar
 Mudar Zahran (born 1973), Jordanian Palestinian writer

Surname/family name

 Elias bin Mudar
 Rabiah ibn Mudhar, Jewish king of Himayar

See also
Mudar (disambiguation)